Calybites trimaculata is a moth of the family Gracillariidae. It is known from Japan (Shikoku island and the Ryukyu Islands).

The wingspan is 7-8.5 mm.

The larvae feed on Persicaria chinensis. They mine the leaves of their host plant. The larva is a leaf miner in the early stage, and a leaf roller in the late stage. The mine occurs upon the lower side of the leaf and is very small and tentiformed. When nearly half-grown, the larva leaves the mine and migrates to the margin of the leaf, then cuts off the leaf along the margin into a narrow stripe, which it rolls up to form a cone on the lower side of the leaf. The cocoon is formed inside the cone. It is whitish and spindle-shaped.

References

Gracillariinae
Moths of Japan
Moths described in 1982